Civic railway station was located on the Newcastle line in New South Wales, Australia. It served the Civic part of Newcastle's central business district, opening on 22 December 1935. The station had the smallest signal box in the state to control the Merewether Street level crossing. The signal box closed in July 1992. Civic station closed on 25 December 2014, when the Newcastle line was truncated to terminate at Hamilton. In 2019, Civic was reopened as a park named "Museum Place" due to it being a short distance from Newcastle Museum. The area between the platforms was filled in, and the station buildings remained intact.

Platforms & services
Civic had two side platforms that could accommodate six carriages. At the time of its closure, it was serviced by trains from Sydney Central to Newcastle and local services from Newcastle to Maitland, Muswellbrook, Scone, Telarah and Dungog.

Platform 1 was for services to Newcastle. Platform 2 was for services to Gosford, Sydney Central, Maitland, Telarah, Dungog, Muswellbrook & Scone.

In 2007, Platform 2 was extended at its western end to allow Merewether Street level crossing to remain open while trains are stopped at the station.

References

External links

Civic station details Sydney Trains

Disused regional railway stations in New South Wales
Railway stations in the Hunter Region
Railway stations in Australia opened in 1935
Railway stations closed in 2014
2014 disestablishments in Australia
Railway stations in Australia opened in 1857